Nannette V. Jolivette Brown (born November 19, 1963) is the chief United States district judge of the United States District Court for the Eastern District of Louisiana. She previously served in the role of city attorney for the city of New Orleans from the time that Mayor Mitch Landrieu hired her in May 2010 until becoming a federal judge in 2011. As city attorney, Brown was responsible for all city contracts and oversaw all legal matters for the city.

Early life and education
Brown received a Bachelor of Arts degree from University of Southwestern Louisiana in 1985, and then attended Tulane Law School, where she received a Juris Doctor in 1988 and a Master of Laws in Energy and Environment in 1998.

Career
From 1988 to 1992, Brown practiced corporate and environmental litigation at the New Orleans office of the firm of Adams & Reese LLP, From 1996 to 1998 she was working for the Onebane Law Firm. From 2000 to 2003, Brown was employed by Milling, Benson, Woodward LLP. Between 2004 and 2007, she practiced at the firm Chaffe McCall LLP and again with this firm from 2009 until 2010. From 2007 to 2009, she was a visiting assistant clinical professor at Loyola University New Orleans College of Law.

Federal judicial service
Brown was nominated to fill the seat of Judge Stanwood Duval by President Barack Obama on March 2, 2011. The United States Senate confirmed her by unanimous consent on October 3, 2011. She received her judicial commission the following day. She became Chief Judge on May 15, 2018, after Kurt D. Engelhardt was appointed to the United States Court of Appeals for the Fifth Circuit.

See also 
 List of African-American federal judges
 List of African-American jurists
 List of first women lawyers and judges in Louisiana

References

External links
 
 

1963 births
Living people
20th-century American women lawyers
20th-century American lawyers
21st-century American judges
21st-century American women judges
21st-century American women lawyers
21st-century American lawyers
African-American judges
African-American lawyers
Louisiana city attorneys
American environmental lawyers
Judges of the United States District Court for the Eastern District of Louisiana
Loyola University New Orleans faculty
Tulane University Law School alumni
United States district court judges appointed by Barack Obama
University of Louisiana at Lafayette alumni